Edward Monroe Freeman (February 12, 1875 – February 5, 1954) was an American botanist.

Early life
Born at St. Paul to Swiss parents, Freeman went to public schools and graduated from Central High School 1892. Next, Freeman did not initially go to college for agriculture. He instead enrolled at the University of Minnesota's College of Science, Literature, and the Arts rather than their University Farm.

Botanist
Freeman was persuaded by professor of botany Conway MacMillan to become a botanist. He graduated with a B.Sc. in 1898, and became a lecturer and did graduate work there, obtaining his M.Sc. in 1899.

Direction decided
The next year Freeman suddenly struck upon the decision to become a plant pathologist while he was at Wood's Hole in Massachusetts for the summer.

Pathologist
He arranged to go the next year to study at Cambridge University under Harry Marshall Ward, and thus began one of Freeman's most notable accomplishments: Introducing a great deal of European knowledge of plant pathology and methods to American education and practice. Ward and Freeman would work together for only the next year; they entered controversies and resolved them with relative ease, and by the end of the year had settled several famous questions of seed pathology and rust taxonomy. It was one of these - details of seeds residency in a Lolium temulentum-Puccinia rust pathosystem - that also became Freeman's PhD in a few years.

In 1902 he returned to U Minn as a lecturer, and then assistant professor of botany and plant pathology in 1908. Although in the future universities would embrace applied disciplines, erect new departments for them, and teach courses specifically about them, at the time classical education was the goal. Freeman proposed these changes as early as his return in 1902 but his mentor MacMillan was his greatest opposition. Eventually he would relent, however, and botany moved beyond pure theory for the first time at the College. Then, in 1907, the University wired him, asking him to found an entirely new department. He agreed, and before he could even return the University created it as the Division of Plant Pathology and Botany in the Agriculture Department and Freeman was given charge of it upon his return. In 1909, a local high school teacher named Stakman became only the third lecturer in the Division, and its first grad student.

Eventually, Freeman became dean of the College in 1917. One of his best known works of this time is Minnesota Plant Diseases. He retired in 1943, and died at his home nearby 11 years later on February 5, 1954.

References

Authored bibliography
 
 
  8 volumes. 211 figures.

  CABD 20057001278.

American science writers
American botanists
Writers from Saint Paul, Minnesota
University of Minnesota alumni
University of Minnesota faculty
1875 births
1954 deaths